Golden Grove was launched at Teighmouth in 1786 as a West Indiaman, and apparently immediately sailed to the West Indies. She first entered Lloyd's Registry in 1793 with Tobagonian ownership. She then became a London-based West Indiaman. A Spanish privateer captured her in 1805, but the British Royal Navy recaptured her within months in a sanguinary cutting-out expedition. She then returned to the West Indian trade. After 1810 she apparently started sailing between London and Dublin. In 1817 she grounded but was gotten off. She apparently was lost c.1821.

Career
Although Golden Grove was launched in 1786, she does not appear in Lloyd's Register until 1793. At that time her master is M'Leod, her owner is in Tobago, and her trade is Tobago—London.

Capture and recapture
Around May 1805, a Spanish privateer schooner captured Golden Grove, Blair, master, as she was sailing from Virginia to Liverpool. The privateer also captured the brig Ceres, Meffervey, master, which had been sailing from Virginia to Guernsey. The Spaniards took both into Florida where they were condemned as prizes.

On 7 July the boats of  ascended the St Mary’s River. There they recaptured Golden Grove and the British brig Ceres, and captured the Spanish privateer schooner that had captured the two British vessels. A British sailor and marine were killed, and 14 were wounded. The Spaniards suffered 25 men killed (including five Americans), and 22 wounded. Most of the casualties occurred on Golden Grove, on which the Spaniards had put 50 men; she was armed with eight 6-pounder guns and six swivel guns.  

On 18 August, the Jamaica Fleet, 109 vessels under the escort of four British vessels, left Jamaica for England, Golden Grove among them. They cleared the Gulf, but then between 21 and 23 August encountered a severe gale. Nine vessels foundered, but Golden Grove was among those "well" on the 25th.

Later career

On 21 January 1817 Golden Grove, Taylor, master, ran aground on the Sow and Pigs Sandbank, in the North Sea off the coast of Northumberland. She was on a voyage from Gothenburg, Sweden to Stockton-on-Tees, County Durham.

Fate
LR for 1821 carried the annotation "Lost" by her name.

Notes

Citations

1786 ships
Age of Sail merchant ships
Merchant ships of the United Kingdom
Captured ships